The following is a list of uranium mines and mills, including former uranium mines:

Ontario

Saskatchewan

Northwest Territories

References 
Uranium mines in Ontario
Mining in Ontario
 Uranium
Canada economy-related lists
EWL Management Limited
Rio Algom
Denison Mines